Hillcroft  may refer to:
 Hillcroft Avenue
 Mahatma Gandhi District a district of Houston, Texas, United States on Hillcroft Avenue
 Hillcroft Transit Center Station,  a proposed terminus of Houston METRORail's future University Line
 Hillcroft College, residential adult education college for women in South London, England
 Hillcroft Preparatory School, a former independent co-educational school in Suffolk, England
 Hillcroft School, a former boys' secondary school in South London, England